Ya Narin is a Cambodian judge and member of the Khmer Rouge Tribunal. He is president of the Mondulkiri Court and was formerly president of the Rattanakiri Court. He has a PhD in criminology from the State and Law Institute of Kazakhstan.

References

External links

Living people
Year of birth missing (living people)
Cambodian judges
Khmer Rouge Tribunal judges